Istrana is a comune (municipality) in the Province of Treviso in the Italian region Veneto, located about  northwest of Venice and about  west of Treviso.

The municipality of Istrana contains the frazioni (subdivisions, mainly villages and hamlets) Sala, Pezzan, Ospedaletto, and Villanova. And the Istrana Air Base.

Istrana borders the following municipalities: Morgano, Paese, Piombino Dese, Trevignano, Vedelago.

Climate 
Instrana has a humid subtropical climate (Köppen: Cfa), similar to the rest of northern Italy.

Demographic evolution

Twin towns
Istrana is twinned with:

  Grenade, Haute-Garonne, France, since 1989
  Lapa, Paraná, Brazil, since 2002

References

External links
 www.istrana.it/ 

Cities and towns in Veneto